Flame grevillea may refer to the following Grevillea species from Australia:

Grevillea dimorpha, endemic to Victoria
Grevillea excelsior, endemic to Western Australia
Grevillea pungens, endemic to the Northern Territory

Grevillea taxa by common name